AVM Productions is an Indian film production studio founded by A. V. Meiyappan. It is the final oldest survived studio in India. The filming studios are located in Vadapalani, Chennai. It has produced over 300 films in Tamil, Telugu, Kannada, Malayalam and Hindi cinema. AVM has introduced numerous actors in Southern industries, some of the prominent actors are Sivaji Ganesan, Rajkumar, S. S. Rajendran, Vyjayanthimala, Kamal Haasan and many more. The AVM Studios besides the shooting floors, has recording, dubbing and a preview theatre. The complex also houses facilities for production and post production processing.

Early history 
Born on 28 July 1907, Avichi Meiyappan hailed from a Nattukottai Nagarathar family of Karaikudi in Tamil Nadu.  Avichi Chettiar ran a mini-department store, named AV & Sons. It sold gramophone records. Meiyappan, who joined his father's shop even as a teenager, decided to produce gramophone records instead of merely marketing them. He came to Madras where along with friends K. S. Narayana Iyengar, Subbaiah Chettiar and others promoted Saraswathi Stores. He found excellent support in K. P. Varadachari, its manager, and his lawyer friend Thoothukudi Govindachari Raghavachari he produced many records.

AVM Productions ventured into OTT space by announcing Tamil Stalkers, a crime thriller inspired from a real-life film piracy group, directed by Arivazhagan.

Maiden venture 

The dawn of the talkie era (1931) inspired Meiyappan to start Saraswathi Sound Productions and he launched his maiden movie venture, Alli Arjuna a Hindu mythology based movie. The film was shot in Calcutta and proved a total flop as the one that followed named Ratnavali. At this point, an aspiring amateur actor and college graduate A. T. Krishnaswamy joined the unit as assistant director who was associated with Meiyappan for nearly a decade and wrote and directed the early AVM productions.

The reverses forced Meiyappan to lie low but only for a while. In association with Jayanthilal, a cinema house owner based in Bangalore, he promoted a new company Pragati Pictures Limited. Grabbing an opportunity that came his way, AVM made Nandakumar, Tamil version of a Marathi film launching it as a Pragati production. The highlight of this movie was the debut of T. R. Mahalingam in to Tamil movie Industry.

The film was a landmark because for the first time playback singing was tried, with Lalitha Venkatraman singing for the actor who played Devaki. Meiyappan took the sprawling Club House off Mount Road on lease and shot scenes without going to studios and erecting sets. Soon after he shifted his unit to another sprawling edifice known as Admiralty House in Adyar.

Success 

In 1940, Meiyappan produced Bhoo Kailas, a Telugu mythological film which created history. Its lead players were from Telugu and Kannada cinema, and was directed by Sundar Rao Nadkarni, a Mangalorean who had his training in Bombay. The film turned out to be a big hit and also won critical acclaim! Meiyappan struck gold with comedy next. Sabapathy (1941) with the saucer-eyed T. R. Ramachandran in the lead, along with Kali N. Rathnam and K. Sarangapani was a runaway success. Then came a series of hits like En Manaivi, Harishchandra (1943), Sri Valli.

The city of Madras began to feel the strains of the World War II raging on elsewhere and to reduce the exposure from Japanese bombing, Meiyappan moved his facilities to Karaikudi. In the outskirts of the town karaikudi he occupied a drama auditorium with a large open area around it on long lease and erected a studio. Thus was born AVM Productions with AVM Studios.

Hits like Nam Iruvar (1947), Parasakthi (1952), Andha Naal (1954), and the National Award-winning Hum Panchhi Ek Daal Ke (1957) followed.

Meiyappan died on 12 August 1979, and after his demise his sons took over the mantle.

In 2007, AVM produced Sivaji which at  95 crore, was said to be the most expensive film ever made in the history of the Indian film industry at that time.

In 2013, AVM led by Aruna Guhan and Aparna Guhan started producing films to be screened only on the net. Their first such production was a 55-minute-film, titled Idhuvum Kadandhu Pogum.

Filmography

Films

Serials

Tamil Serials
Nimmathi Ungal Choice (Sun TV)
Galatta Kudumbam (Sun TV)
Aachi International (Sun TV)
Gopi (Sun TV)
Roja (Jaya TV)
Girija M. A. (Jaya TV)
Aasai (Sun TV)
Vairakkiyam (Kalaignar)
Take It Easy Vazhkai (Sun TV)
Vaazhnthu Kaatugiren (Sun TV)
Oru Pennin Kathai (Sun TV)
Vairanenjam (Kalaignar)
Nambikkai (Sun TV)
Sorgam (Sun TV)
Aval Oru Minsaram (Kalaignar)
Uravukku Kai Koduppom (Kalaignar)
Mohini (Kalaignar)
Nimmathi (Sun TV)
Naanayam (Sun TV)
Sondham (Sun TV)
Paasam (Sun TV)
Aarthi (Raj TV)
Geethanjali (Raj TV)
Dhik Dhik Dhik (Sun TV)
Vaazhkai (Sun TV)
Savale Samaali (Raj TV)

Malayalam serials
Jeevitham (Surya TV))
Nirvathi Nirvathi Ningal choice (Surya TV)
Swantham Maalotty (Surya TV)
Swarna Manasu (Asianet)

Telugu serials
Aadajanma (Star Maa)
Aarthi (ETV)
Akka (Gemini TV)
Akila (Gemini TV)
Aanandam Mee choice (Gemini TV)
Deivam (Gemini TV/Star Maa)
Eenatti Ramayanam (ETV)
Matrudevatha(ETV)
Jeevitham (Gemini TV)
Nammakam (Gemini TV)
Janaki (Gemini TV)
Jyothi (Gemini TV)
Swargam (Gemini TV)
Paasam (Gemini TV)
Aasha (Gemini TV)
Samsaram (Star Maa/Vissa TV)
Swanthanga Raktha Sambandham (Star Maa)
Kodalu Dhithina Kapuram (Gemini TV)

Web series
Tamil Rockerz (Sony Liv)

Awards

Notes

References

External links 

 List of films produced by AVM

Film distributors of India
Film production companies of India
Film production companies based in Chennai
Indian film studios
Mass media companies established in 1945
Indian companies established in 1945
Producers who won the Best Popular Film Providing Wholesome Entertainment National Film Award
Producers who won the Best Children's Film National Film Award
Television production companies of Tamil Nadu